Annie Laurie Wilson James (born November 5, 1862) was an American journalist. Among other work, she focused on the compilation of horse pedigrees and heredity problems in horses. She was the assistant editor and manager of Breeder and Sportsman, published in San Francisco, California.

Personal life and education
Annie Laurie Wilson was born in Louisville, Kentucky, on November 5, 1862. She was a daughter of William Henry Wilson, for many years a breeder of trotting horses, residing in Abdallah Park, Cynthiana, Kentucky. Her mother was Miss Annie Eliza Cook, a Pennsylvanian by birth and a Virginian by residence.

Wilson attended the public school in Cynthiana, graduating in 1879. In the fall of that year, she entered the freshman class in Wellesley College, Wellesley, Massachusetts. During five years, she pursued her studies in that institution, her health not permitting continuous study, although vigorous when not confined to the schoolroom. In January, 1884, she was forced by illness to leave the college. Again in Kentucky, she soon recovered and was eagerly looking forward to the resumption of her studies in the fall of that year.

Career
In August 1884, her father was ruined by a fire, in which he lost US$100,000. Wilson decided to support herself and became a teacher at Cynthiana high school. She divided the teaching of the four-year course with the principal. She taught French, German, Latin, arithmetic, algebra, geometry, trigonometry, English and history. While teaching she assisted her father in arranging his papers after the fire. She also helped with his correspondence. In this way, she  became a most invaluable and trustworthy confidential clerk to him. 

In 1886, she resigned her position in the Cynthiana school and devoted herself entirely to the work of her father's office. She continued to carry on his work until 1888, when he sent her to California on a business trip. While she was in San Francisco, she formed the acquaintance of the owners of the "Breeder and Sportsman," and they offered her a lucrative position as assistant editor and business manager of that journal. She accepted their offer, and for eight months, filled the position, making good use of her varied and intimate knowledge of the trotter and the thoroughbred. Her knowledge of the pedigrees of the famous horses of the United States is full, accurate and remarkable.

Among other work, she compiled horse pedigrees, in which statistics play a prominent part. Aside from that, she was a student of the problems of heredity in horses. She was a fluent, direct and luminous writer, and her position as an authority on the horse was unique.

Personal life
On 19 January 1889, she married Robert Bruce James. Alter their marriage, they lived for a time on their farm near Gilroy, California. They next removed to their ranch near Baker City, Oregon. A son, Oscar William James, was born on 6 November 1889.

From early childhood, James was a member of the Episcopal Church. She was a devoted Sunday-school worker. While yet in Wellesley College, she became a member of the Woman's Christian Temperance Union. Wherever she lived, she was affiliated, if practicable, with the missionary society. She was one of the charter-members of the Cynthiana Library Association, which founded a valuable public library in that town. In Wellesley College, she was a member of Phi Sigma.

References

Attribution

Bibliography

1862 births
Year of death missing
American women journalists
People from San Francisco
Writers from Louisville, Kentucky
19th-century American writers
19th-century American women writers
Wellesley College alumni
Kentucky women writers
Kentucky women in equestrian field
Wikipedia articles incorporating text from A Woman of the Century